On 29 December 2019, the United States conducted airstrikes against Kata'ib Hezbollah's weapons depots and command centers in Iraq and Syria, reportedly killing at least 25 militiamen and wounding 55 more. The U.S. Department of Defense said the operation was in retaliation for repeated attacks on Iraqi military bases hosting Operation Inherent Resolve (OIR) coalition forces, particularly the 27 December 2019 attack on a Kirkuk airbase that left an American civilian contractor dead. Kata'ib Hezbollah, an extremist Shi'ite militia funded by Iran, denied any responsibility for the attacks.

The unilateral U.S. airstrikes were condemned by the Iraqi government, Iraqi Armed Forces personnel, and Iran, and culminated in the U.S. embassy in Baghdad being attacked by Iraqi militiamen and their supporters on 31 December 2019. This in turn led to a U.S. airstrike near Baghdad International Airport on 3 January 2020, killing Iranian general Qasem Soleimani and Kata'ib Hezbollah commander Abu Mahdi al-Muhandis.

Background

The United States intervened in Iraq in 2014 as a part of Operation Inherent Resolve (OIR), the U.S.-led mission to combat the Islamic State of Iraq and the Levant (ISIL) terror organization, and have been training and operating alongside Iraqi forces as a part of the anti-ISIL coalition. ISIL was largely beaten back from Iraq in 2017 during an internal conflict, with the help of U.S.-backed forces and Sunni and Shia militias. Iran, which also intervened in Iraq, is known to support Shia Iraqi militias, a number of which are relatively hostile to the U.S. presence in Iraq and the Sunni-led Iraqi government. Tensions rose between Iran and the U.S. in 2018 when U.S. President Donald Trump unilaterally pulled out of the 2015 nuclear deal and reimposed sanctions.

On 27 December 2019, the K-1 Air Base in Kirkuk province, Iraq—one of many Iraqi military bases that hosted Operation Inherent Resolve coalition personnel—was attacked by multiple rockets, killing a U.S. civilian contractor and injuring four U.S. service members and two Iraqi security forces personnel. The U.S. blamed the Iranian-backed Kata'ib Hezbollah militia for the attack while the group denied responsibility.

A senior U.S. official said there had been a "campaign" of 11 attacks on Iraqi bases hosting OIR personnel in the two months before the 27 December incident, many of which the U.S. attributed to Kata'ib Hezbollah.

Strikes

At around 11:00 am EST on 29 December 2019, the United States attacked five Kata'ib Hezbollah positions in Iraqi and Syrian territory. According to the Pentagon, the U.S. targeted three locations in Iraq and two in Syria, including weapon storage facilities and command and control posts. One U.S. official claimed the strikes were carried out by F-15E fighter jets using precision-guided bombs and that secondary explosions were observed after some of the strikes, indicating the sites may have contained stored munitions. The ammunition facilities reportedly held both rockets and drones used by the militia.

The U.S. did not specify the locations of the strikes, but one of the Iraqi strikes had reportedly targeted a headquarters of the militia in or near al-Qa'im District along the western border with Syria. The strikes in Syria took place along the Middle Euphrates River Valley (MERV) in the southeast of the country.

Casualties
Reportedly, at least 25 militia fighters were killed and 55 wounded. According to Iraqi security and militia sources, at least four local Kata'ib Hezbollah commanders were among the dead in the Iraqi strikes, including Abu Ali Khazali. U.S. officials could not confirm the militia casualty counts.

Aftermath

Following the strikes on 29 December, U.S. officials warned that further actions could be undertaken to defend U.S. interests and "deter further bad behavior from militia groups or from Iran". U.S. President Donald Trump was briefed before and after the strikes by his national security advisors and was informed that a further military response could be warranted.

In a statement, U.S. Assistant to the Secretary of Defense Jonathan Hoffman called the strikes "defensive" and stated that they were in retaliation to prior Kata'ib Hezbollah attacks on both Operation Inherent Resolve coalition forces and their Iraqi partners in prior weeks and months. Hoffman also asserted that the militia had received weapons from Iran's Quds Force that have been used to attack OIR forces. U.S. Secretary of State Mike Pompeo considered the attacks a warning against any actions by Iran that endangers the lives of Americans.

Reactions in Iraq
An Iraqi Armed Forces spokesman stated that U.S. Defense Secretary Mark Esper informed Iraqi Prime Minister Adil Abdul-Mahdi half an hour before the operation, to which he strongly objected to and condemned; the spokesman called the unilateral U.S. airstrikes "a treacherous stab in the back". Prime Minister Abdul-Mahdi later declared three days of national mourning, from 31 December 2019 until 2 January 2020. The prime minister argued that the strikes did not take place based on evidence of a specific threat but was instead geopolitically motivated by the regional tensions between Iran and the U.S.

Senior Popular Mobilization Units commander Abu Mahdi al-Muhandis said "Our response will be very tough on the American forces in Iraq".

U.S. embassy attack

On 31 December, PMF militiamen and their supporters attacked the U.S. Embassy in Baghdad, prompting the U.S. to deploy additional soldiers to help quell the situation.

Other reactions
  - Iranian Foreign Ministry spokesman Abbas Mousavi said the U.S. had "openly shown its support to terrorism and shown its negligence to the independence and national sovereignty of countries". He added that the U.S. must accept responsibility of the consequences of the "illegal attacks". In response to U.S. assertions that Iran was behind the Iraqi airbase attacks, the supreme leader of Iran tweeted "If Iran wants to fight a country, it will strike directly."
  - Bahrain's foreign ministry released a statement supporting the airstrikes.
  - Israeli Prime Minister Benjamin Netanyahu praised the airstrikes and emphasized the militia's ties to Iran.
  - Russia's foreign ministry called the situation unacceptable and called for restraint from both sides.
  - In a statement, Lebanon's Hezbollah called the strikes "a blatant violation on the sovereignty, security and stability of Iraq and the Iraqi people".

See also
 February 2021 United States airstrike in Syria
 Iranian involvement in the Syrian Civil War
 2019–2021 Iraqi protests
Iraqi conflict (2003–present)

References

2019 airstrikes
American airstrikes during the Syrian civil war
Attacks in Iraq in 2019
Attacks in Syria in 2019
December 2019 events in Syria
December 2019 events in Iraq
Iraq–United States relations
Iran–United States relations
Syria–United States relations
Military operations involving the United States
Operation Inherent Resolve
Presidency of Donald Trump